The 1989–90 Eintracht Frankfurt season was the 90th season in the club's football history. In 1989–90 the club played in the Bundesliga, the top tier of German football. It was the club's 27th season in the Bundesliga.
Eintracht Frankfurt striker Jørn Andersen won the Bundesliga top goalscorer, as the first foreigner ever to win the artillery trophy.

Matches

Legend

Friendlies

Indoor soccer tournament

Bundesliga

League table

League fixtures and results

DFB-Pokal

Squad

Squad and statistics

|}

Notes

References

Sources

External links
 Official English Eintracht website 
 German archive site
 1989–90 Bundesliga season at Fussballdaten.de 

1989-90
German football clubs 1989–90 season